Calesiodes is a genus of moths of the family Erebidae. Its only species, Calesiodes punctiger, is found in Borneo. Both the genus and the species were first described by Roepke in 1941.

References

Calpinae